The first magazine for women, Slovenka (Slovenian Woman), was published in Slovenia in 1896. During the 1960s the literary magazines played a significant role in Slovenia's liberalization.

In 2004 there were nearly 1,000 printed media in Slovenia, including newspapers, magazines and journals. In addition to local magazines, the Slovenian versions of foreign magazine titles, such as Playboy, Elle and Men’s Health, are also distributed in the country.

The following is an incomplete list of current and defunct magazines published in Slovenia. It also covers those magazines before the independence of the country. They may be published in Slovenian or in other languages.

A
 Anja
 Avtomanija
 Avenija

B
 Bravo 
 Bukla

D
 Demokracija
 Dolenjski list
 Dom in svet
 Družina

F
 Finance Trendi
 Flaneur

H
 Hopla

J
 Jana
 Joker
Hallmark Film Television

K
 Kmečki glas

L
 Lady
 Literati
 Love Style'
 Ljubljanski zvonM
 Mag Maxi Mladina MM Slovenija Moj mikro Moje financeN
 Naša kronika Naša žena Nedeljski dnevnik Nova Nova revijaO
 ObraziP
 Planinski VestnikR
 Računalniške noviceRazpotja Reporter RSQS
 The Slovenia Times Slovenski glasnik Sodobnost StoryZ
 Življenje in tehnika''

See also
List of newspapers in Slovenia
List of Slovene newspapers

References

Slovenia
Magazines